Kalabhavan (lit. "The House of Arts"), also known as Cochin Kalabhavan, is a centre for learning performing arts in Kochi, India. Kalabhavan is notable and known for being the first organised performing mimicry group in Kerala and which popularised the art of mimicry in the state of Kerala. Ever since its founding, Kalabhavan has served as a grooming centre for acting aspirants. Hence, Kalabhavan has contributed numerous actors as well as film directors to Malayalam cinema.

Founded on 3 September 1969, by C.M.I. priest Fr. Abel, with the help of K. K. Antony, a music teacher, and K. J. Yesudas, then a budding playback singer, started Kalabhavan as the Christian Arts Club to promote Christian music, what Kalabhavan initially took up was producing Christian religious songs. Later they moved on to Ganamela (Concerts for film songs). Mimicry performances of individual artists were used as 'fillers' in between stage programs. Later, mimicry was organised as a team event to form the now popular Mimics Parade.

The professional mimicry troupe of Kalabhavan began with a team of 6 consisting of Siddique, Lal, Anzar, K. S. Prasad, Varkkichan and Rahman. It was this team that invented Mimics Parade in the present form. Harisree is the other notable mimics troupe in Kerala.

In 2015, Kalabhavan opened its UAE centre at Sharjah.

Notable alumni 
(In chronological order)
 Siddique, director
 Lal, actor and director
 Zainuddin
 Jayaram
 Kalabhavan Rahman
 Harisree Ashokan
 Dileep
 Nadirshah
 Kalabhavan Abi 
 N. F. Varghese
 Kalabhavan Mani
 Salim Kumar
 Kalabhavan Shajohn
 Narayanankutty
 Thesni Khan
 Hakim Rawther
 Bindu Panicker
 Machan Varghese
 Sujatha Mohan
 Kalabhavan Navas
 Rafi of Rafi Mecartin duo
 Mecartin of Rafi Mecartin duo 
 Berny of Berny-Ignatius duo
 Kalabhavan Haneef

References 

Indian impressionists (entertainers)
Arts of Kerala
Culture of Kochi
Performing arts education in India
Art schools in India
1969 establishments in Kerala